is a passenger railway station located in the city of Kameoka, Kyoto Prefecture, Japan, operated by West Japan Railway Company (JR West).

Lines

Station layout
The station consists of two opposed side platforms connected to the station building by a footbridge. The station is staffed.

Platforms

History
Chiyokawa Station opened on 20 July 1935. With the privatization of the Japan National Railways (JNR) on 1 April 1987, the station came under the aegis of the West Japan Railway Company. 

Station numbering was introduced in March 2018 with Chiyokawa being assigned station number JR-E13.

The current station building was renovated in 2021 and opened for service in February of that year.

Passenger statistics
In fiscal 2019, the station was used by an average of 2153 passengers daily.

Surrounding area
 Tanba Kokubun-ji 
 Izumo-daijingū
 Kameoka City Chiyokawa Elementary School,

See also
List of railway stations in Japan

References

External links

 Station Official Site

Railway stations in Kyoto Prefecture
Sanin Main Line
Railway stations in Japan opened in 1935
Kameoka, Kyoto